Bellwood School District 88 (SD88) is a pre-kindergarten through eighth grade school district located in the western suburbs of the Chicago metropolitan area.  It operates seven schools that educate over 2,000 students from the municipalities of Bellwood, Broadview, Hillside, Melrose Park, and Stone Park.

Schools 
Primary Schools:
 Lincoln Primary/Early Childhood Center

 Grant Primary
Elementary Schools:
 Grant Elementary School 
 Lincoln Elementary School
 McKinley Elementary School
 Thurgood Marshall Elementary School
Middle School:
 Roosevelt Middle School

References

External links
 Bellwood School District 88

School districts in Cook County, Illinois